Meistriliiga is the top division men's football league in Estonia.

Meistriliiga may also refer to the following sports leagues:

Naiste Meistriliiga, Estonian women's top division football league
Meistriliiga (ice hockey), Estonian top division ice hockey league
Korvpalli Meistriliiga, Estonian top division basketball league
Meistriliiga (handball), Estonian top division handball league
Rannajalgpalli Meistriliiga, Estonian top division beach soccer league
Saalijalgpalli Meistriliiga, Estonian top division futsal league